Michael David Wood,  (born 23 July 1948) is an English historian and broadcaster. He has presented numerous well-known television documentary series from the late 1970s to the present day. Wood has also written a number of books on English history, including In Search of the Dark Ages, The Domesday Quest, The Story of England, and In Search of Shakespeare. He was appointed Professor of Public History at the University of Manchester in 2013.

Early life and education
Wood was born in Moss Side, Manchester. He attended Heald Place Primary School in Rusholme. When he was eight, his family moved to Paulden Avenue, Wythenshawe where he could see historic Baguley Hall from his bedroom window. He went to Benchill Primary School. At Manchester Grammar School, he developed an interest in theatre, playing Grusha in the first British amateur production of Brecht's The Caucasian Chalk Circle and later Hamlet in Hamlet. He took A-levels in English, French and History.

Wood studied history and English at Oriel College, Oxford, touring the United States for six weeks in his final year, and graduated with a second class Bachelor of Arts degree. Later, he undertook post-graduate research in Anglo-Saxon history at Oriel. Three years into his research for a DPhil, he left to become a journalist with ITV.

Career
In the 1970s Wood worked for the BBC in Manchester. He was first a reporter and then an assistant producer on current affairs programmes before returning to his love of history with his 1979–81 series In Search of the Dark Ages for BBC2. He quickly became popular with female viewers for his blond good looks (he was humorously dubbed "the thinking woman's crumpet" by British newspapers), his deep voice and his habit of wearing tight jeans and a sheepskin jacket. Wood's work is also well known in the United States, where it receives much airplay on PBS and on various cable television networks. The series Legacy (1992) is one of his more frequently broadcast documentaries on US television.

Since 1990 Wood has been a director of independent television production company Maya Vision International. In 2006 he joined the British School of Archaeology in Iraq campaign, the aim of which was to train and encourage new Iraqi archaeologists, and he has lectured on the subject. In 2013, Wood joined the University of Manchester as Professor of Public History.

Personal life
His girlfriend for ten years, in the late 1970s and early 1980s, was the late journalist and broadcaster Pattie Coldwell. He currently lives in north London with his wife, television producer Rebecca Ysabel Dobbs, and two daughters, Minakshi and Jyoti.

Honours
Wood was a Fellow of the Royal Historical Society until 2007. In 2009 he was awarded an Honorary Doctorate of Arts by Sunderland University. This was followed by the honorary degree of Doctor of Letters by the University of Leicester in 2011 and in 2015 he was awarded the President's Medal by the British Academy. Having previously been President of the Leicestershire Archaeological and Historical Society, in 2017 he accepted the position of Honorary Life Vice President, offered in recognition of his work on the documentary series Michael Wood's Story of England. Michael Wood is currently the president of the Society for Anglo-Chinese Understanding, an organization founded in 1965 to promote understanding and friendship between the British and the Chinese people.

Wood was elected a Fellow of the Society of Antiquaries in 2008.

Wood was appointed Officer of the Order of the British Empire (OBE) in the 2021 New Year Honours for services to public history and broadcasting.

Television series
 In Search of the Dark Ages (1979–81)
 Great Railway Journeys ("Zambezi Express", 1980)
 Great Little Railways (episode 3: "Slow Train to Olympia", 1983)
 In Search of the Trojan War (1985)
 Domesday: A Search for the Roots of England (1986)
 Greece: The Hidden War (1986)
 Art of the Western World (1989)
 Legacy: A Search for the Origins of Civilisation (1992)
 Lifeboat (1993)
 In the Footsteps of Alexander the Great (1997)
 Conquistadors (2000)
 In Search of Shakespeare (2003)
 In Search of Myths and Heroes (2005)
 The Story of India (2007)
 Christina: A Medieval Life (2008)
 In Search of Beowulf (2009) (a.k.a. Michael Wood on Beowulf)
 Michael Wood's Story of England (2010)
 The Great British Story: A People's History (2012)
 King Alfred and the Anglo Saxons (2013)
 The Story of China (2016)

Documentaries
 Darshan: An Indian Journey (1989)
 Traveller's Tales: The Sacred Way (1991)
 Saddam's Killing Fields (1993)
 Secret History: Hitler's Search for the Holy Grail (1999)
 Gilbert White: Nature Man (2006)
 Christina: A Medieval Life (2008)
 Alexander's Greatest Battle (2009)
 Shakespeare's Mother; The Secret Life of a Tudor Woman (2015)
 Ovid: The Poet and the Emperor (2017)
 How China Got Rich (2019)
 Du Fu: China's Greatest Poet (2020)

Bibliography
 In Search of the Dark Ages (BBC Books, 1981)
 In Search of the Trojan War (1985)
 Domesday: A Search for the Roots of England (1988)
 Legacy: A Search for the Origins of Civilization (1992), London: Network Books/BBCbooks/London BCA.
 The Smile of Murugan: A South Indian Journey (1995)
 In the Footsteps of Alexander the Great (1997)
 In Search of England: Journeys into the English Past (1999)
 Conquistadors (2000)
 In Search of Shakespeare (2003)
 In Search of Myths and Heroes (2005)
 India: An Epic Journey Across the Subcontinent (2007)
 The Story of England (2010)
  The Story of China  (2020)

References

External links

Michael Wood at the British Film Institute
 
Writings
The Story of the Conquistadors
In Search of Shakespeare
In Search of Myths and Heroes
"The Life of an Anglo-Saxon Princess". The Guardian, 2010
Interview
 2012 video interview

1948 births
Living people
English historians
English documentary filmmakers
Historians of antiquity
Alumni of Oriel College, Oxford
People educated at Manchester Grammar School
Anglo-Saxon studies scholars
Fellows of the Royal Society of Literature
Fellows of the Royal Historical Society
People from Moss Side
Recipients of the President's Medal (British Academy)
Officers of the Order of the British Empire